For system configuration in general see System configuration.
 For the Microsoft Windows System Configuration utility see MSConfig.